Bengal Repertory is a Bengali theater group from Kolkata. The group is famous for its destination theatre festival 'Natya Dhara' in India.

Major productions 
Until April, 2020 Bengal Repertory has staged several full-length plays. Some of those are:

 Vasana
 Manan
 Katha-Karnabhar
 Aradhika
 Ashwatthama-the war machine
 Krishna the man alone
 Advut Andhar Ek
 MeghMalhar

Theatre Festival: Natya Dhara 
Bengal Repertory's Natya Dhara is a theatre festival, which is the first ever destination theatre festival in West Bengal, India.

References

External links 
 

Bengali theatre groups
Theatre companies in India